Phacelia parishii is an uncommon species of phacelia known by the common name Parish's phacelia. It is native to the desert southwest of the United States, where it is known from scattered occurrences in Nevada and Arizona, and about two occurrences in California. It grows in desert scrub and alkali soils such as in playas, barren dry lakes, and gypsum beds.

It is coated in soft, short, glandular hairs. The small, fuzzy inflorescence is a one-sided curving or coiling cyme of narrow bell-shaped flowers.

External links
Jepson Manual Treatment
Arizona Game & Fish Department Profile
Photo gallery

parishii
Flora of the California desert regions
Flora of Arizona
Flora of Nevada
Flora without expected TNC conservation status